Jacob Jones (born 5 September 2001) is a Welsh professional footballer who plays for Bath City on loan from Forest Green Rovers, as a defender.

Club career
Jones began his career at Swansea City, before moving to Forest Green Rovers in July 2022. In October 2022, Jones joined National League South club Bath City on a one-month loan deal.

International career
Jones is a Wales under-20 youth international.

References

2001 births
Living people
Welsh footballers
Swansea City A.F.C. players
Forest Green Rovers F.C. players
Bath City F.C. players
Association football defenders
Wales youth international footballers
English Football League players